Chelonid alphaherpesvirus 6 (ChHV-6) is a species of virus of uncertain generic placement in the subfamily Alphaherpesvirinae, family Herpesviridae, and order Herpesvirales.

References

External links
 

Alphaherpesvirinae